All European Academies (ALLEA) is the European Federation of Academies of Sciences and Humanities. It was founded in 1994, and brings together more than 50 Academies of Sciences and Learned Societies from over 40 member countries of the Council of Europe. Since May 2018, the President of ALLEA is Antonio Loprieno. ALLEA is financed by annual dues from its member academies and remains fully independent from political, religious, commercial or ideological interests. The ALLEA secretariat is based on the premises of the Berlin-Brandenburg Academy of Sciences and Humanities in Berlin.

Mission 
ALLEA's mission includes facilitating the collaboration between Academies, fostering excellence and high ethical standards in the conduct of research, promoting the autonomy of science and research, representing the European Academies' positions to the European authorities, and contributing to the improvement of the framework conditions for science and research. Jointly with its Member Academies, ALLEA is in a position to address the full range of structural and policy issues facing Europe in science, research and innovation. In doing so, it is guided by a common understanding of Europe, bound together by historical, social and political factors as well as for scientific and economic reasons.

Member Academies 
ALLEA Member Academies operate as learned societies, think tanks, or research performing organisations. They are self-governing communities of leaders of scholarly enquiry across all fields of the natural sciences, the social sciences and the humanities. ALLEA therefore provides access to an unparalleled human resource of intellectual excellence, experience and expertise. Furthermore, its integrative membership structure comprises Academies from both European Union (EU) and non–EU member states in Europe.

List of members academies 
Academy of Sciences of Albania
Armenian Academy of Sciences
Austrian Academy of Sciences
National Academy of Sciences of Belarus
Royal Academy of Sciences, Letters and Arts of Belgium
Académie royale de langue et de littérature françaises de Belgique
Royal Academy of Dutch Language and Literature
Royal Flemish Academy of Belgium for Science and the Arts
Academy of Sciences and Arts of Bosnia and Herzegovina
Bulgarian Academy of Sciences
Croatian Academy of Sciences and Arts
Czech Academy of Sciences
Learned Society of the Czech Republic
Royal Danish Academy of Sciences and Letters
Estonian Academy of Sciences
Council of Finnish Academies
Georgian National Academy of Sciences
German National Academy of Sciences Leopoldina
Union of the German Academies of Sciences and Humanities
Academy of Athens
Hungarian Academy of Sciences
Royal Irish Academy
Israel Academy of Sciences and Humanities
Accademia Nazionale dei Lincei
Istituto Veneto di Scienze, Lettere ed Arti
Accademia delle Scienze di Torino
Academy of Sciences and Arts of Kosovo
Latvian Academy of Sciences
Lithuanian Academy of Sciences
Academy of Sciences of Moldova
Montenegrin Academy of Sciences and Arts
Royal Netherlands Academy of Arts and Sciences
Academy of Sciences and Arts of the Republic of North Macedonia
Norwegian Academy of Science and Letters
Royal Norwegian Society of Sciences and Letters
Polish Academy of Sciences
Polish Academy of Arts and Sciences
Academy of Sciences of Lisbon
Romanian Academy
Russian Academy of Sciences (Associate Member)
Serbian Academy of Sciences and Arts
Slovak Academy of Sciences
Slovenian Academy of Sciences and Arts
Spanish Royal Academy of Sciences
Royal Academy of Sciences and Arts of Barcelona
Institute of Catalan Studies
Royal Swedish Academy of Letters, History and Antiquities
Royal Swedish Academy of Sciences
Swiss Academies of Arts and Sciences
Turkish Academy of Sciences
The Science Academy (Bilim Akademisi)
National Academy of Sciences of Ukraine
The British Academy
Learned Society of Wales
The Royal Society
The Royal Society of Edinburgh
Cyprus Academy of Sciences, Letters and Arts

Working Groups 
The core of the scientific work of ALLEA is performed by its Working Groups. ALLEA Working Groups are advisory bodies concerned with specific issues and providing advice and guidance on matters related to science, science management and science policy on the European level. Their activities and services may vary from advising decision-makers and the general public to producing memoranda, statements, position papers or reports published under the auspices of ALLEA.

SAPEA 
ALLEA, jointly with four other European academy networks, forms part of the EU-funded SAPEA (Science Advice for Policy by European Academies) project, bringing together knowledge and expertise of Fellows from over 100 Academies across Europe. SAPEA provides interdisciplinary, independent and evidence based-scientific advice on policy issues to the European Commission and the European public in the context of the European Commission's Scientific Advice Mechanism.

References

External links 
 

International organizations based in Europe
College and university associations and consortia in Europe